Vrčin  (Serbian Cyrillic: Врчин) is a suburban settlement of Belgrade, Serbia. It is located in Belgrade's municipality of Grocka.

Name 

Though the village itself was mentioned much later, historians Dušan J. Popović and Vladimir Ćorović traced the name of the locality back to the Roman period and the nearby temple of [N]orcinium. It was dedicated to the Etruscan-Roman goddess of destiny, Nortia. After Slavic settlement, Roman names ending with -cin[ium] were mostly contracted to čin, while suffix -dunum was morphed into din. [N]orcinium was thus shortened to [N]orčin and then modified to Vrčin.

Geography 

Vrčin is located southeast of Avala mountain, in the central-eastern part of the municipality, 20 km southeast of Belgrade and 14 km west of the municipal seat of Grocka. It is situated in the spring area of the Bolečica river and is a major crossroad located on the Belgrade-Požarevac railway, the Belgrade-Niš highway, a regional road connecting the highway and the road of Smederevski put (through Zaklopača) and another one connecting the highway and the Belgrade-Kragujevac road.

Neighborhoods 

Vrčin has several neighborhoods of its own. They can be roughly divided into two sections, north and south of the highway.

North section:

 Cerje (Церје) is the southernmost extension of this section. It is not connected to the rest of Vrčin in the urban sense. It is named after the cer, Turkey oak.
 Donja Mala (Доња Мала, "lower alley"), constitutes the bulk of the northern section.
 Jankovići (Јанковићи) is the  easternmost section which makes the urban connection to Zaklopača. It is named after a family surname.
 Tranšped (Траншпед) is the northern extension that is closest to Belgrade and is named after the "Tranšped" company.

South section:

 Avramovići (Аврамовићи) is a northern section named after a family surname.
 Bajića Kraj (Бајића Крај) is the eastern section  named after a family surname.
 Carino Naselje (Царино Насеље) is the south-eastern extension along the highway.
 Feroplast (Феропласт) is named for the "Feroplast" company.
 Gornja Mala (Горња Мала, "upper alley") is the central part of the entire neighborhood.
 Malo Polje (Мало Поље, "little field") is the south-western extension.
 Orlovica (Орловица, "eagle hill").
 Pobrđani (Побрђани, "hilly places"), the central-south extension.
 Ravnice (Равнице, "flat fields"), the southernmost extension.

Economy 

Despite the recent development of workshops and the commercial sector (including the building of a shopping mall in the center of the settlement), the economy is mostly based on agriculture.

Politics 

Vrčin  was once the seat of its own municipality,  which was disbanded and incorporated into the municipality of Grocka. From time to time, motions have been made proposing the separation of Vrčin from Grocka, due to the distance from its municipal seat and the fact that it is more populous than Grocka.  Recent proposals have called for the split of Vrčin and several settlements from the Voždovac municipality (Zuce, Pinosava, Ripanj, Beli Potok) into a new, sub-Avalan municipality of Avalski Venac.

Population 
Vrčin is statistically classified as a rural settlement (village) and officially is the second most populous settlement in the municipality (Census 2002; after Kaluđerica but ahead of the municipal seat of Grocka). However, unofficial estimates that include refugees (not counted in the official census reports) also put Leštane before Vrčin.

Vrčin extends on both sides of the highway (originally developed from the western side). The eastern extension is colloquially known asTranšped (Cyrillic: Траншпед). This area forms a continuous build-up area with Zaklopača. Vrčin has experienced a steady growth of population:

 1921 – 3,470
 1948 – 5,040
 1953 – 5,342
 1961 – 6,042
 1971 – 6,263
 1981 – 7,327
 1991 – 7,589 (de facto)
 1991 – 8,034 (de jure)
 2002 – 8,667 (de facto)
 2002 – 9,328 (de jure)
 2011 – 9,088

References

Sources 

 Jovan Đ. Marković (1990): Enciklopedijski geografski leksikon Jugoslavije; Svjetlost-Sarajevo; 

Suburbs of Belgrade
Former and proposed municipalities of Belgrade
Šumadija